Mariano Venancio (born 1947) is a Spanish stage, television and film actor.

Biography 
Mariano Venancio was born in Salamanca in 1947. He studied childhood education in Salamanca but moved to Madrid to train his acting chops and pursue a career as an actor. While he has worked primarily on stage, he has also featured in film and television works. His television credits include performances in Amar en tiempos revueltos, Cuéntame, Plutón B.R.B. Nero, and De repente, los Gómez. His performance as José (the father of a dying girl, embodying doubt and inability to cope with the death of a loved one), in the 2008 film Camino earned him a Best Film Actor in a Leading Role award at the 18th Actors and Actresses Union Awards.

Filmography

Film

Television

References 

1947 births
People from Salamanca
Spanish male film actors
Spanish male television actors
Spanish male stage actors
21st-century Spanish male actors
Living people